Ajeet Singh Kharkhari (born 22 August 1955 in Delhi) is an Indian Politician and a leader of Bharatiya Janata Party. He was elected to Delhi Legislative Assembly from Najafgarh constituency in Fifth Delhi Assembly.

References

1955 births
Delhi MLAs 2013–2015
Living people
Bharatiya Janata Party politicians from Delhi